Shipmates is a 1931 American Pre-Code comedy film directed by Harry A. Pollard and written by Louis F. Edelman, Delmer Daves, Raymond L. Schrock, Frank Wead, and Malcolm Stuart Boylan. The film stars Robert Montgomery, Ernest Torrence, Dorothy Jordan, Hobart Bosworth, Cliff Edwards and Gavin Gordon. The film was released on April 25, 1931, by Metro-Goldwyn-Mayer.

Cast
Robert Montgomery as Jonesey
Ernest Torrence as Scotty
Dorothy Jordan as Kit
Hobart Bosworth as Admiral Corbin
Cliff Edwards as Bilge
Gavin Gordon as Mike
Joan Marsh as Mary Lou
Edward Nugent as What-Ho 
E. Alyn Warren as Wong
George Irving as Captain Beatty
Hedda Hopper as Auntie
William Worthington as Admiral Schuyler
Eddy Chandler as Sailor (uncredited)
Bud Geary as Deck Officer (uncredited)
Robert Livingston as Man on Patio Escorting Girls (uncredited)
Paddy O'Flynn as Sailor (uncredited)
Charles Sullivan as Chief Petty Officer (uncredited)

References

External links

1931 films
American comedy films
1931 comedy films
Films directed by Harry A. Pollard
Metro-Goldwyn-Mayer films
American black-and-white films
1930s English-language films
1930s American films